Aegean numbers was an additive sign-value numeral system used by the Minoan and Mycenaean civilizations. They are attested in Linear A and Linear B scripts. They may have survived in the Cypro-Minoan script, where a single sign with "100" value is attested so far on a large clay tablet from Enkomi.

Unicode

See also
Linear A
Linear B
Greek numerals

References

External links
 Open source font for rendering aegean numerals correctly - Google Noto Fonts

Aegean languages in the Bronze Age
Numeral systems